A seed is an encased plant embryo.

Seed or seeds may also refer to:

Arts, entertainment, and media

Fictional entities
 SeeD, a mercenary working for Garden in the video game Final Fantasy VIII
 SEED, the unknown, plantlike life form that features in the video game Phantasy Star Universe

Films

 Seed (1931 film), a film notable for an early appearance by Bette Davis
 Seed, a 1997 short film starring Rose McGowan
 The Seed (short film), a 2005 short film produced and directed by Joe Hahn of Linkin Park
 Seed (2007 film), a Canadian horror film by Uwe Boll
 The Seed (2021 film), a British body horror film by Sam Walker
 Seed Productions, Hugh Jackman's film production company

Gaming
 Seed (2006 video game), a defunct MMORPG developed by Runestone Game Development
 Seed (upcoming video game), an upcoming MMO simulation game developed by Klang Games
 Map seed, a number or text string used to initialize a procedural map generator in a video game

Music

Groups and labels
 Seed Records, a record label
 The Seeds, a 1960s rock 'n' roll band
 Seeed, a German reggae fusion band

Albums

 Seed (Afro Celt Sound System album), or the title song
 Seed (Nick Harper album), 1995
 Seeds (Brother Cane album), 1995
 Seeds (Hey Rosetta! album), 2011
 Seed (Mami Kawada album), 2006
 Seeds (TV on the Radio album), 2014

Songs
 "Seed", by The Academy Is... from Santi
 "Seed", by Carbon Leaf from Nothing Rhymes with Woman
 "Seed", by Korn from Follow the Leader
 "Seed", by Mudvayne from The Beginning of All Things to End'''
 "Seed", by Sublime from Sublime "Seeds", by Bruce Springsteen from Live/1975–85 "The Seed (2.0)", by The Roots and Cody Chesnutt, 2002
 "The Seed", by Aurora from A Different Kind of Human (Step 2)Periodicals and books
 Seed (magazine), a U.S. science magazine
 Seed (student newspaper), published at Victoria University, Melbourne, Australia
 Chicago Seed (newspaper), published in Chicago, Illinois, U.S., in the late 1960s
 The Seed (novel), a 1940 novel by Tarjei Vesaas

Television and anime
Series
 Seed (TV series), a Canadian TV series
 Mobile Suit Gundam SEED, a Japanese anime seriesMobile Suit Gundam SEED Destiny, its sequel

Episodes
 "Seed" (The Walking Dead), 2012
 "Seeds" (Agents of S.H.I.E.L.D.), 2014
 "Seeds" (The Handmaid's Tale), 2018
 "Seeds" (Law & Order: Criminal Intent), 2007
 "Seeds" (Sons of Anarchy), 2008
 "The Seed" (Stargate Atlantis), 2008

Visual arts
Sculptures by the Singaporean sculptor Han Sai Por
 Seed Series (1998)Seeds (2006)

Education
 SEED Foundation, operates boarding schools for disadvantaged youth in Washington, D.C. and Baltimore, Maryland
 SEED School (Toronto), a Toronto District School Board alternative high school located in Toronto, Canada

Organizations
 SEED (organization), a global partnership for action on sustainable development and the green economy
 The Seed (organization), a controversial drug rehabilitation program in the United States that operated between 1970 and 2001
 Seed, a climate change activist organisation for Aboriginal and Torres Strait Islander young people

Science and technology
Computing
 Seeds (cellular automaton), a cellular automaton rule similar to Conway's Game of Life Seeding (computing), a practice within peer-to-peer file sharing
 Seed (BitTorrent), a peer that has a complete copy of a torrented file and still offers it for upload
 Seed (programming), a JavaScript library of the GNOME
 Random seed, a value used to initialize a pseudo-random number generator
 SEED, a Korean block cipher
 Seed7, an extensible general-purpose programming language
 Backdoor.Win32.Seed, a backdoor Trojan

Other uses in science and technology
 Seed, a synonym for sperm or semen
 Seed crystal, a small crystal from which a larger single crystal is to be grown
 AOL Seed, an open content submission website and platform where writers and photographers could submit their work and get paid for each work submitted
 Standard for the Exchange of Earthquake Data, a data specification from the International Federation of Digital Seismograph Networks
 Strategic Explorations of Exoplanets and Disks with Subaru (SEEDS), a multi-year astronomical survey seeking to identify extrasolar planets and disks around nearby stars using the Subaru telescope in Hawaii

Other uses
 Seed (sports), a ranked competitor for the purposes of a tournament draw
 Seed (surname)
 Seed money, an early stage in the development of an entrepreneurial firm
 Bīja'', literally "seed", a metaphor for the origin or cause of things in Buddhism and Hinduism

See also

 
 
 Seeed, a German band
 SEEEED, a region of the CCDC47 protein
 Seeding (disambiguation)
 Seedling (disambiguation)
 Seeed (disambiguation)
 Sead (disambiguation)
 Seid (disambiguation)
 Sed (disambiguation)
 Seyd